This is the list of awards and nominations received by the American drama series ER,  which aired on NBC from September 19, 1994 until April 2, 2009. It has been nominated for 375 industry awards and has won 116. ER won the George Foster Peabody Award in 1995, and won 22 of the 124 Emmy Awards for which it was nominated. It also won the People's Choice Award for "Favorite Television Dramatic Series" every year from 1995 to 2002. Over the years, it has won numerous other awards, including Screen Actors Guild Awards, Image Awards, GLAAD Media Awards, and Golden Globe Awards, among others.

Emmy Awards

Primetime Emmy Awards
Nomination Submissions
1995
For the first season, Edwards submitted "Love's Labor Lost"; Clooney submitted "Long Day's Journey"; Wyle submitted "Hit and Run"; Marguiles submitted "Sleepless in Chicago"; La Salle submitted "9 ½ Hours" and "Everything Old Is New Again; and Stringfield submitted "Motherhood".

Creative Arts Emmy Awards

Eddie Awards

ALMA Awards

Artios Awards

BMI Awards

CAS Awards

DGA Awards

GLAAD Media Awards

Golden Globe Awards

Humanitas Prize

Golden Reel Awards

NAACP Image Awards

People's Choice Awards

Prism Awards

PGA Awards

SAG Awards

Teen Choice Awards

Satellite Awards

Television Critics Association Awards

TV Guide Awards

Viewer's for Quality Television Awards

Visual Effects Society Awards

WGA Awards

Young Artist Awards

Other awards

References

Lists of awards by television series
ER (TV series)